The 2019–20 USC Trojans Women's Basketball team represents the University of Southern California during the 2019–20 NCAA Division I women's basketball season. The Trojans play their home games at the Galen Center and are members of the Pac-12 Conference. The squad is led by head coach Mark Trakh, who is in his 3rd year of his 2nd stint (8th year overall) with the Women of Troy. The season ended abruptly after the Pac-12 Tournament due to the COVID-19 pandemic. The team was expected to participate in the WNIT, but it was canceled.

Roster

Schedule

|-
!colspan=9 style=| Non-conference regular season

|-
!colspan=9 style=| Pac-12 regular season

|-
!colspan=9 style=| Pac-12 Women's Tournament

Rankings
2019–20 NCAA Division I women's basketball rankings

References

USC Trojans women's basketball seasons
USC
USC Trojans basketball, women
USC Trojans basketball, women
USC Trojans basketball, women
USC Trojans basketball, women